Zach Hart Sorensen (born January 3, 1977 in Salt Lake City, Utah) is a former Major League Baseball second baseman and shortstop.

Drafted by the Cleveland Indians in the 2nd round of the  amateur draft, Sorensen would make his Major League Baseball debut with the Indians on June 3, . In , Sorensen played 12 games in the majors for the Anaheim Angels.

In , Sorensen played for the Albuquerque Isotopes, the Triple-A affiliate of the Florida Marlins, before retiring on April 22, 2007.

External links
Zach Sorensen at Baseball Reference.com
Zach Sorenson Minor League Splits and Situational Stats

1977 births
Living people
Cleveland Indians players
Los Angeles Angels players
Baseball players from Utah
Major League Baseball infielders
Kinston Indians players
Akron Aeros players
Buffalo Bisons (minor league) players
Nashville Sounds players
Albuquerque Isotopes players
Mahoning Valley Scrappers players